Million Women Rise (MWR) is a women-only march and rally against violence against women, held annually in London on a Saturday close to International Women's Day, 8 March. The march starts in Hyde Park and moves through Oxford Street in the famous West End shopping district, stopping traffic. It is followed by a rally in Trafalgar Square, with survivors of violence speaking to the crowd.

MWR has no corporate sponsors, and the organisers are grassroots activists without ties to large charities or NGOs. It was founded in 2007 by campaigner and former outreach worker Sabrina Qureshi. She was motivated in part by her childhood experiences growing up on a multicultural London housing estate, where violence against women was often treated as normal and unremarkable. She was also inspired by women's movements around the world, including women she met during a visit to Palestine and the DRC who continued their activism even amid danger and violence.

Million Women Rise (MWR) believes that male violence against women and children is a global pandemic that devastates lives and threatens to undermine efforts to bring about sustainable development.

References

External links

Protest marches
Annual events in London
March events
Violence against women in the United Kingdom
Women's events
Women in London